Lithodes aoteoroa is a species of king crab in the family, Lithodidae, and was first described in 2010 by Shane T. Ahyong.

References

External links
Lithodes aotearoa occurrence data from GBIF

Crustaceans described in 2010
Taxa named by Shane T. Ahyong